Frederick Cornelius Alston (1895–1987) was an American painter known for his landscapes, portraits, and paintings of urban life.

Biography 
Alston was born on October 31, 1895 in Wilmington, North Carolina. He studied painting, architecture, and rendering at the Pennsylvania School of Industrial Arts and Shaw University. In 1930, Alston took the position of Art Director at Sumner High School. His work is in the collection of the Tuskegee Institute, where he taught architectural rendering from 1922 to 1924.

Alston exhibited work in the St. Louis Citizens Art Commission, the St. Louis Society of Independent Artists, and the Urban League of St. Louis. 

Alston died on August 1, 1987, in Columbia, Maryland.

References

External links 
Artists clippings files available at:
 Frederick Cornelius Alston: Artist File. St. Louis Public Library, St. Louis, Missouri.
 Urban League of St. Louis Collection, SC 18:72, St. Louis Public Library, St. Louis, Missouri.
 People's Art Center of St. Louis, SC 18:70, St. Louis Public Library, St. Louis, Missouri.

1895 births
1987 deaths
20th-century American painters
People from Wilmington, North Carolina
Shaw University alumni